The Yorkton Terriers are a team in the Saskatchewan Junior Hockey League (SJHL) based in Yorkton, Saskatchewan, Canada.  The team plays their home games in the Farrell Agencies Arena, which has a seating capacity of 2,300.  The Terriers won the 2014 Royal Bank Cup as Junior A Champions of Canada.

History
The team joined the SJHL for the 1972–73 season and won its first league championship in 1983.  The Terriers have competed in the Junior "A" National Championships on four other: 1991 in Sudbury, Ontario, 1996 in Melfort, Saskatchewan, 1999 as the hosts in Yorkton, 2006 in Brampton, Ontario, and 2014 in Vernon, British Columbia, where the captured their only national championship.

The team has won the league championship six times in its history: 1983, 1991, 2005, 2006, 2013, and 2014.

Season-by-season standings

Playoffs
1973 Lost Quarter-final
Prince Albert Raiders defeated Yorkton Terriers 4-games-to-1
1974 Lost Quarter-final
Saskatoon Olympics defeated Yorkton Terriers 4-games-to-1
1975 DNQ
1976 DNQ
1977 DNQ
1978 DNQ
1979 DNQ
1980 DNQ
1981 Lost Quarter-final
Estevan Bruins defeated Yorkton Terriers 4-games-to-3
1982 Lost Final
Yorkton Terriers defeated Melville Millionaires 4-games-to-none
Yorkton Terriers defeated Weyburn Red Wings 4-games-to-3
Prince Albert Raiders defeated Yorkton Terriers 4-games-to-none
1983 Won League, Lost Anavet Cup
Yorkton Terriers defeated Estevan Bruins 4-games-to-none
Yorkton Terriers defeated Melville Millionaires 4-games-to-1
Yorkton Terriers defeated Weyburn Red Wings 4-games-to-3 SAJHL CHAMPIONS
Dauphin Kings (MJHL) defeated Yorkton Terriers 4-games-to-1
1984 Lost Final
Yorkton Terriers defeated Humboldt Broncos 4-games-to-1
Yorkton Terriers defeated Lloydminster Lancers 4-games-to-1
Weyburn Red Wings defeated Yorkton Terriers 4-games-to-1
1985 DNQ
1986 Lost Quarter-final
Humboldt Broncos defeated Yorkton Terriers 4-games-to-none
1987 Lost Semi-final
Yorkton Terriers defeated Nipawin Hawks 4-games-to-3 
Humboldt Broncos defeated Yorkton Terriers 4-games-to-none1988 Lost FinalYorkton Terriers defeated Melville Millionaires 4-games-to-1Yorkton Terriers defeated Humboldt Broncos 4-games-to-1Notre Dame Hounds defeated Yorkton Terriers 4-games-to-21989 Lost Semi-finalYorkton Terriers defeated Flin Flon Bombers 4-games-to-noneHumboldt Broncos defeated Yorkton Terriers 4-games-to-11990 Lost FinalYorkton Terriers defeated Battlefords North Stars 4-games-to-1Yorkton Terriers defeated Humboldt Broncos 4-games-to-2Nipawin Hawks defeated Yorkton Terriers 4-games-to-2
1991 Won League, Won Anavet Cup, Lost 1991 Centennial Cup semi-final
Yorkton Terriers defeated Notre Dame Hounds 4-games-to-none
Yorkton Terriers defeated Weyburn Red Wings 4-games-to-1
Yorkton Terriers defeated Humboldt Broncos 4-games-to-none SJHL CHAMPIONS
Yorkton Terriers defeated Winkler Flyers (MJHL) 4-games-to-1 ANAVET CUP CHAMPIONS
First in 1991 Centennial Cup round robin (3-1)
Vernon Lakers (BCHL) defeated Yorkton Terriers 7-5 in semi-final
1992 Lost Quarter-final
Estevan Bruins defeated Yorkton Terriers 4-games-to-none
1993 Lost Quarter-final
Estevan Bruins defeated Yorkton Terriers 4-games-to-2
1994 Lost Quarter-final
Yorkton Terriers defeated Lebret Eagles 3-games-to-1
Melville Millionaires defeated Yorkton Terriers 4-games-to-none
1995 Lost Quarter-final
Weyburn Red Wings defeated Yorkton Terriers 4-games-to-3
1996 Lost Final, Lost 1996 Royal Bank Cup semi-final
Yorkton Terriers defeated Notre Dame Hounds 4-games-to-none 
Yorkton Terriers defeated Estevan Bruins 4-games-to-3
Melfort Mustangs defeated Yorkton Terriers 4-games-to-1
Fourth in 1996 Royal Bank Cup round robin (1-3)
Melfort Mustangs defeated Yorkton Terriers 7-3 in semi-final
1997 DNQ
1998 DNQ
1999 Lost Quarter-final, Host 1999 Royal Bank Cup and lost Semi-final
Notre Dame Hounds defeated Yorkton Terriers 4-games-to-3
Second in 1999 Royal Bank Cup round robin (3-1)
Charlottetown Abbies (MJAHL) defeated Yorkton Terriers 6-5 2OT in semi-final
2000 Lost Preliminary round robin
Third in round robin (2-2) vs. Estevan Bruins and Weyburn Red Wings
2001 DNQ
2002 DNQ
2003 Lost Semi-final
Yorkton Terriers defeated Weyburn Red Wings 4-games-to-2
Melville Millionaires defeated Yorkton Terriers 4-games-to-2
2004 Lost Semi-final
Yorkton Terriers defeated Melville Millionaires 4-games-to-2
Weyburn Red Wings defeated Yorkton Terriers 4-games-to-2
2005 Won League, Lost Anavet Cup
First in round robin (4-0) vs. Notre Dame Hounds and Estevan Bruins
Yorkton Terriers defeated Notre Dame Hounds 4-games-to-none
Yorkton Terriers defeated Estevan Bruins 4-games-to-3
Yorkton Terriers defeated Battlefords North Stars 4-games-to-3 SJHL CHAMPIONS
Portage Terriers (MJHL) defeated Yorkton Terriers 4-games-to-2
2006 Won League, Won Anavet Cup, Lost 2006 Royal Bank Cup final
Second in round robin (2-2) vs. Notre Dame Hounds and Melville Millionaires
Yorkton Terriers defeated Weyburn Red Wings 4-games-to-2
Yorkton Terriers defeated Notre Dame Hounds 4-games-to-none
Yorkton Terriers defeated Battlefords North Stars 4-games-to-1  SJHL CHAMPIONS
Yorkton Terriers defeated Winnipeg South Blues (MJHL) 4-games-to-1 ANAVET CUP CHAMPIONS
Fourth in 2006 Royal Bank Cup round robin (1-3)
Yorkton Terriers defeated Streetsville Derbys (OPJHL) 2-1 in semi-final
Burnaby Express defeated Yorkton Terriers 8-2 in final
2007 Lost Semi-final
Third in round robin (1-3) vs. Melville Millionaires and Estevan Bruins
Yorkton Terriers defeated Estevan Bruins 4-games-to-2
Melville Millionaires defeated Yorkton Terriers 4-games-to-3
2008 Lost Quarter-final
Yorkton Terriers defeated Estevan Bruins 4-games-to-2 
Melville Millionaires defeated Yorkton Terriers 4-games-to-none
2009 Lost Quarter-final
Melville Millionaires defeated Yorkton Terriers 4-games-to-3
2010 Lost Final
Yorkton Terriers defeated Melville Millionaires 3-games-to-1
Yorkton Terriers defeated Weyburn Red Wings 4-games-to-1
Yorkton Terriers defeated Kindersley Klippers 4-games-to-3
La Ronge Ice Wolves defeated Yorkton Terriers 4-games-to-2
2011 Lost Final
Yorkton Terriers defeated Estevan Bruins 4-games-to-none
Yorkton Terriers defeated Melfort Mustangs 4-games-to-1
La Ronge Ice Wolves defeated Yorkton Terriers 4-games-to-3
2012 Lost Quarter-final
Melville Millionaires defeated Yorkton Terriers 4-games-to-1
2013 Won League
Yorkton Terriers defeated Estevan Bruins 4-games-to-1
Yorkton Terriers defeated Melville Millionaires 4-games-to-2
Yorkton Terriers defeated Humboldt Broncos 4-games-to-2 SJHL CHAMPIONS
Third in Western Canada Cup round robin (2-2)
Yorkton Terriers defeated Nanaimo Clippers (BCHL) 5-3 in runner-up semi-final
Brooks Bandits (AJHL) defeated Yorkton Terriers 1-0 in runner-up final
2014 Won League, Won Western Canada Cup, Won 2014 Royal Bank Cup
Yorkton Terriers defeated Notre Dame Hounds 4-games-to-1
Yorkton Terriers defeated Humboldt Broncos 4-games-to-1
Yorkton Terriers defeated Melville Millionaires 4-games-to-none SJHL CHAMPIONS
Second in Western Canada Cup round robin (2-2)
Yorkton Terriers defeated Dauphin Kings (MJHL) 5-4 in final WCC CHAMPIONS
Third in 2014 Royal Bank Cup round robin (2-2)
Yorkton Terriers defeated Vernon Vipers (BCHL) 6-3 in semi-final
Yorkton Terriers defeated Carleton Place Canadians (CCHL) 4-3 OT in final NATIONAL CHAMPIONS

See also
 List of ice hockey teams in Saskatchewan

References

External links
 Yorkton Terriers official website

Saskatchewan Junior Hockey League teams
Sport in Yorkton